Mahdi Kadhim (born 1 July 1967) is an Iraqi former football midfielder who played for Iraq in the 1994 FIFA World Cup qualification. He played for the national team between 1992 and 1993. 

Madhi played two matches for Iraq and scored in the 1994 FIFA World Cup qualification against Yemen.

Career statistics

International goals
Scores and results list Iraq's goal tally first.

References

Iraqi footballers
Iraq international footballers
Living people
1967 births
Association football midfielders